Maurício Kozlinski (born 18 June 1991), commonly known as Kozlinski, is a Brazilian professional footballer who plays as goalkeeper for Guarani.

Honours
Atlético Goianiense
 Campeonato Goiano: 2019, 2020

References

External links

1991 births
Living people
Brazilian footballers
Association football goalkeepers
Campeonato Brasileiro Série A players
Campeonato Brasileiro Série B players
Campeonato Brasileiro Série D players
Iraty Sport Club players
Veranópolis Esporte Clube Recreativo e Cultural players
Futebol Clube Santa Cruz players
Grêmio Esportivo Juventus players
Clube Atlético Metropolitano players
Operário Ferroviário Esporte Clube players
Avaí FC players
Atlético Clube Goianiense players
Guarani FC players